Abdulaziz Mohamed Ali Khador (born 12 December 1965) is a United Arab Emirates former professional footballer who played as a forward for the United Arab Emirates national team and Sharjah FC. He was a member of United Arab Emirates squad in the 1990 FIFA World Cup in Italy and the 1997 FIFA Confederations Cup in Saudi Arabia.

References

External links
 
 

1965 births
Living people
Emirati footballers
Association football forwards
United Arab Emirates international footballers
1988 AFC Asian Cup players
1990 FIFA World Cup players
1996 AFC Asian Cup players
1997 FIFA Confederations Cup players
UAE Pro League players
Sharjah FC players